The Embassy of Afghanistan in London is the primary diplomatic mission of the Islamic Republic of Afghanistan to the United Kingdom. It is located at 31 Princes Gate in London's South Kensington district.

The building now used for the embassy was constructed by Charles James Freake in the late 1850s.

Earlier residents include the industrialist Charles Wright, chairman of Baldwins, and George Whiteley, 1st Baron Marchamley.

Afghanistan bought this building in 1925.

Gallery

See also
 List of diplomatic missions in London
 Afghanistan–United Kingdom relations
 Embassy of the United Kingdom, Kabul
 Ambassadors of the United Kingdom to Afghanistan
 :Category:Ambassadors of Afghanistan to the United Kingdom

References

Afghanistan
London
Afghanistan–United Kingdom relations